American rapper Redman has released eight studio albums, three collaborative albums, five mixtapes, one EP and twenty eight singles.

Albums

Studio albums

Collaborative albums

Other

Singles

Other charted songs

Guest appearances

See also
 Method Man & Redman discography

Notes

References

Discographies of American artists
Hip hop discographies